The Battle of Callinicum took place on Easter Saturday, 19 April 531 AD, between an army of the Byzantine Empire under Belisarius and a Sasanian cavalry force commanded by Azarethes. After being defeated at the Battle of Dara, the Sasanians moved to invade Roman Syria in an attempt to turn the tide of the war. Belisarius' rapid response foiled the plan, and his troops pushed the Persians to the Syrian border through maneuvering before forcing a battle in which the Sasanians won a Pyrrhic victory.

Prelude 
In April 531 AD, the Persian king Kavadh I sent an army under Azarethes, consisting of a cavalry force numbering about 15,000 Aswaran with an additional 5,000 Lakhmid Arab cavalry  under Al-Mundhir, to invade Syria, not through the heavily-fortified frontier cities of Roman Mesopotamia, but through the less conventional but also less-defended route in Commagene in order to capture Syrian cities such as Antioch.

The Persian army crossed the frontier at Circesium on the Euphrates and marched north. As they neared Callinicum, Belisarius set out to follow them as they advanced westwards. Belisarius' forces consisted of about 5,000 men and another 3,000 Ghassanid Arab allies, for the remainder of his army had been left to secure Dara. The Byzantines blocked the Persian advance at Chalcis, where reinforcements under Hermogenes also arrived, bringing the Byzantine force to some 20,000 men. The Persians were forced to withdraw to the east, followed by the Byzantines.

The battle would occur on Easter Sunday, and the convention at the time was to fast on the day and well into the night. Due to this, if Belisarius were to give battle he would have to fight using hungry troops. Azarethes sent a message to Belisarius asking him to honor the fast for the sake of the Christians and Jews in his army, as well as the Christian forces of Belisarius himself. Belisarius was willing to agree and originally intended to drive off the Persians without a risky battle. The Byzantine troops, however, were over-confident after their recent victories at Dara and Satala and clamored for battle. After failing to convince his men, and realizing they would possibly mutiny unless he agreed, Belisarius prepared his force for battle.

Deployment 

The two armies met outside Callinicum on 19 April 531. Belisarius anchored his left flank on the Euphrates, composed of the Byzantine heavy infantry under the command of the emperor Justinian's bodyguard Petrus. The Byzantine cavalry was stationed in the center, many of which were cataphracts under the command of Ascan.  Next were the Lycaonian and/or Isaurian infantry under Stephanacius and Longinus, positioned such that their right was anchored on a rising slope occupied by the army's right wing, which consisted of the 5,000 allied Ghassanid cavalry. Belisarius himself took up a position in the center of his army. Unlike his deployment at Dara, he concentrated his best cavalry in the center and the infantry and allied cavalry on the wings, possibly because he anticipated the infantry and Ghassanid cavalry could flee.

Azarethes, who was an "exceptionally able warrior" according to Byzantine historian and chronicler Procopius, chose a more conventional deployment by dividing his army into three equal parts:  the allied Lakhmid cavalry under Al-Mundhir forming the Sasanian left wing, opposing the Ghassanids, while his own cavalry formed the center and right flank.  It is possible that he also held an reserve of elite Aswaran behind his center.

Battle 

The battle began with extensive exchange of arrow shots, with Procopius noting the rapidness of the Persian archery. This difference in archery is also mentioned in the Strategikon of Maurice, who had advised closing in with the Persians without any delay. This, combined with a westerly wind, caused the Byzantine side to suffer more casualties at this stage. According to Ian Hughes, however, the casualties were balanced due to the greater penetrative force of Byzantine archery.

Later, after "two-thirds of the day" had elapsed, Azarethes found a weak spot in the Byzantine force and redeployed some of his cavalry to his left wing; this was a similar tactic used at Dara, where the Persians tried to find a weak spot and overwhelm it by creating local numerical superiority. This maneuver was not observed by Belisarius and proved to be a turning point. The Ghassanids were routed off the field with such ease as to later inspire accusations of treachery. This exposed the right flank of the Lycaonian infantry, who were no match for the Persian cavalry and were also routed, while their commanders were killed. The right flank of Ascan's heavy cavalry was now exposed; they fought as best they could, but Ascan was killed and his force defeated.

The Persian cavalry and their Lakhmid allies now controlled the rising ground looking down on the rest of the Byzantine force. As the remainder of the Byzantine cavalry fled and Belisarius was unable to reform his line, the Byzantine infantrymen found themselves pressed against the river. They formed a U-shaped phoulkon (fulcum) formation to defend against the missile attacks, with the top of the "U" being closed by the river and foot-archers in the center of the "U" loosing arrows at the attacking Persians.  They withstood the Persian attacks until nightfall, when they safely escaped across the Euphrates to Callinicum. Apparently, the repeated charges by the Persian cavalry against the Byzantine infantry did not achieve anything more than increasing the casualties on both sides.

The primary sources reporting this phase of the battle are confusing. According to Procopius, Belisarius dismounted and fought alongside the infantry until nightfall, while Malalas reports that Belisarius had fled earlier across the Euphrates on a boat, while his subordinates Sunnicas and Simmas dismounted and fought alongside the infantry. Hughes argues this latter scenario is more probable.

Zacharias of Mytilene said of the battle: "[The Romans] turned and fled before the Persian attack. Many fell into the Euphrates and were drowned, and others were killed." However, it is unknown what stage of the battle Zachariah was referring to.

The factuality of Procopius's description of the events in this battle has been questioned. Both Procopius and Malalas provide a detailed description of the events, but their emphasis is different: Procopius emphasizes Belisarius' success in preventing a complete rout and the Sasanian losses, while Malalas emphasizes Belisarius' early flight from the battlefield, noting that the successful prevention of the rout was led by the doukes Sunicas and Simmas. Both accounts agree on the poor performance of the Lycaonian infantry and possible treachery by the Ghassanids.

Aftermath 

The Byzantine defeat wiped out the benefits of the victory at Dara and gave the initiative once again to the Persians. The strategic outcome of the battle was something of a stalemate; the Byzantine army had lost many soldiers and would not be in fighting condition again for months, but the Persian army had also taken such heavy losses that it was useless for its original purpose of the invasion of Syria.

Following the battle, an inquiry headed by Constantoilus was made against Belisarius due to the defeat at Callinicum and his earlier loss at Thannuris. Belisarius blamed the troops for their impetuous urge to engage in battle at Callinicum and was cleared by the inquiry; however he was relieved of his position as magister militum per Orientem and was recalled to Constantinople by Justinian.

The Sasanian emperor Kavadh I removed Āzārethes from command and stripped him of his honors, due to the very high Persian casualties.

The mutual disaster of Callinicum ended the first of Justinian's series of relatively unsuccessful wars against the Sassanids, leading Byzantium to pay heavy tributes in exchange for the Perpetual Peace treaty signed in the summer of 532.

See also
Iberian War

References

Sources 
 
 
 

531
Callincum 531
Callincum 531
Callinicum
530s in the Byzantine Empire
6th century in Iran
Raqqa
Callincum 531
Callincum 531
Iberian War